Acronemus is an extinct genus of euselachian shark from the Middle Triassic of Switzerland. It is an enigmatic genus of shark with uncertain relations to other sharks. Though originally placed within Ctenacanthiformes, it is now considered Euselachii incertae sedis, due to its mixture of features similar to hybodontiforms and neoselachians. Originally, teeth from this genus were attributed to "Acrodus bicarinatus" while fin spines were named "Nemacanthus tuberculatus". Associated material showed they were the same animal, with the older specific epithet (tuberculatus) taking precedence. The shark was given the new genus Acrocnemus, containing a single species (A. tuberculatus). Acronemus is found in the Anisian-age Grenzbitumenzone (also known as the Besano Formation) of Monte San Giorgio.

References

Elasmobranchii
Prehistoric shark genera